The nations team event competition at the 2013 World Championships was held on 12 February at 17:00 local time, the seventh race of the championships. Athletes from the best 16 nations in the FIS Overall Nations Cup ranking competed.

Rules 
The 16 best nations in the FIS Overall Nations Cup Ranking were eligible to participate in this event. Each team consisted of 4 to 6 skiers, but at least two female and two male skiers.

The format was a knock-out round competition with the pairings being made according to the Nations Cup Ranking. In each pairing, two female and two male skiers from each team raced a parallel slalom in a best-of-4 system. In the event of a tie, the faster cumulated time of the best male and the best female skier decides which team advanced to the next round.

FIS Overall Nations Cup standings
The standings prior to the World Championships:

Spain was eligible to participate, but decided not to. Therefore, top seeded Austria started with a bye in the round of 16 (1/8 finals).

Participating teams 
Every nation consists of 4 to 6 athletes.

Results bracket 
After the withdrawal of Spain and with only 15 nations remaining, top-seed Austria received a bye to second round.

Results

1/8 final

Quarterfinals

Semifinals

Bronze medal races

Gold medal races

References

Nations team event